Dreifürstenstein is a mountain in Zollernalbkreis, Baden-Württemberg, Germany.

Mountains and hills of the Swabian Jura
Hechingen
Burladingen